William Darell may refer to:

William Darell (clergyman) (d. after 1580), English Anglican clergyman and antiquarian
William Darell (British Army officer) (1878–1954), British Army officer

See also
 William Darrell (disambiguation)